Synste Møre is a newspaper published in Møre og Romsdal, Norway. It has a circulation of 2,185.

External links

Newspapers published in Norway